Cherokee High School is one of six public high schools of the Cherokee County School District in Cherokee County, Georgia, United States.  It is located in Canton. Established in 1956, it replaced Canton High School, the county's first high school.

Notable alumni
 Jayson Foster, football player
 Josh Holloway, actor
 Chad Jenkins, baseball player
 Brittain Brown, football player
 Montrell Washington, football player
 AJ Swann, Football player

References

External links
 

Public high schools in Georgia (U.S. state)
Schools in Cherokee County, Georgia
Educational institutions established in 1956
1956 establishments in Georgia (U.S. state)